The rufous-backed Inca finch (Incaspiza personata) is a species of bird traditionally placed in the family Emberizidae, but it may be more closely related to the Thraupidae.

It is endemic to Peru. Its natural habitat is subtropical or tropical high-altitude shrubland.

References

rufous-backed Inca finch
Birds of the Peruvian Andes
Endemic birds of Peru
rufous-backed Inca finch
rufous-backed Inca finch
Taxonomy articles created by Polbot